Andradas is a Brazilian municipality in the state of Minas Gerais. As of 2020 its population is estimated to be 41,396. It is known as "Land of Wine", thanks to Italian immigrants who brought viticulture to the city. It is also known for extreme sports like paragliding, hang-gliding, parachute, and more. Every year athletes from all over the world go to city practice their sport.

References

Municipalities in Minas Gerais